"The One and Only" is the debut single by British singer and actor Chesney Hawkes. Written by Nik Kershaw, the single was released by Chrysalis Records in February 1991. Produced by Kershaw and Alan Shacklock, and recorded and mixed by Gareth Cousins, the song was featured in the 1991 film Buddy's Song which starred Hawkes as the eponymous Buddy and Roger Daltrey as his father. The film performed moderately well at the UK box office, but the song was a hit in that country's music charts, spending five weeks at number one on the UK Singles Chart in March and April 1991. Kershaw's influence can also be heard throughout the track not only in guitar style, but in the backing vocals on the intro and choruses, with Hawkes singing the verses.

In the United States, "The One and Only" was featured in the 1991 film Doc Hollywood. The single proved to be Hawkes' only hit in the US, peaking at number 10 on the Billboard Hot 100 singles chart in November 1991.

Critical reception
Larry Flick from Billboard commented, "Sugar-coated pop rocker by U.K. male vocalist, who was discovered by Roger Daltrey, is beginning to duplicate previous European chart success. Anthemic lyrics and a heartfelt performance should help push this over the top with top 40 punters."

Music videos
Three music videos for the single were produced. The first video is a direct tie-in to Buddy's Song. A girl (played by Saffron) and her friend (played by Lucy Alexander) go to a cinema to watch the film, where Buddy Clark (Hawkes) jumps out of the screen and beckons the girl to follow him. They go into a storage room, but Buddy is then pulled back into the screen; he escapes again, only to have his father Terry (Roger Daltrey) come out of the screen and chase after them. Finally, at the end of the video, Buddy reaches out of the screen to the girl, who takes his hands and goes into the screen with him. They kiss whilst being watched by the girl's shocked friend.

The second video is a live concert performance of the song intercut with black-and-white footage of Hawkes' interaction with his fans. This version was released in international markets where Buddy's Song was not released. The third video is an alternate edit of the second version featuring scenes from Doc Hollywood. All three videos are included in the DVD of the 2022 box set The Complete Picture: The Albums 1991–2012.

Track listing

Charts and certifications

Weekly charts

Year-end charts

Certifications

2022 Nik Kershaw remix

"The One and Only" was remixed by writer Nik Kershaw, performed by Hawkes and released by Chrysalis Records solely on downloads on 4 March 2022 as a non-album single. It is also included as a bonus track on the Spotify, Apple Music, and Amazon Music releases of the compilation The Complete Picture: The Albums 1991–2012.

Track listing

Use in other media

A cover of the song by Ellen and the Escapades was featured in the 2014 film L.A. Slasher.
Director Duncan Jones featured the song in some of his films. In Moon it is used as the wake-up alarm for the main character (ironically, as he soon discovers he is a clone). In the 2011 film Source Code, the song appears as the cellphone ringtone of the character of Christina. It is heard as background music for a game being played in Jones' 2018 film Mute. A deleted scene in Warcraft would have featured Hawkes himself as a bard playing it on a lute.
In 2014, Hawkes performed the song with a flashmob dance group in the streets of Manchester to promote MyMate Loans. In addition, he recorded a version of the song with different lyrics for a MyMate commercial.
On many Counter-strike multiplayer servers the lyric "I am the one and only..." plays when a player's teammates have all been killed leaving him as the only remaining player from his team.
Polish musician Jacek Stachursky covered the song with altered lyrics on his 2000 album 1 under the title Typ Niepokorny (pol. A Defiant Type).
Austrian metal band Dragony covered the song for their 2017 album Lords of the Hunt
In the UK version of Gladiators,the song was played as the intro music of the Gladiator Saracen.
It appears briefly in the fourth episode of the second season of Derry Girls.
Chesney sang the song at halftime at the 2022 FIFA World Cup group stage match between Wales and England.

See also
List of European number-one airplay songs of the 1990s

References

External links
 
 

1990 songs
1991 debut singles
Number-one singles in Austria
UK Singles Chart number-one singles
Chesney Hawkes songs
Songs written by Nik Kershaw
Chrysalis Records singles